Wahyu Aditya, or also called Wadit (born in Malang, March 4, 1980) is an animator from Indonesia. His beginning in the world of animation started by receiving a championship at drawing competitions in his hometown. After high school, his study continued to KvB Institute of Technology, Sydney Australia, with a major in Interactive Multimedia. Wadit succeeded in becoming the best graduate.  A work that has made him famous is 'Dapupu Project' [3]. Two-minute animated film's duration  first prize in Comics and Animation Week organized by the Ministry of National Education Republic of Indonesia when he was in Sydney.

Career 
After return to Indonesia, Wadit decided to establish an animation school called Hello; Motion Academy in 2004. Wadit intention to establish this school is to improve the quality and quantity of animator in Indonesia.

According to Wadit, Hello; Motion is a container mover progress animation and creativity Indonesia under the auspices of the Young Foundation, Animation and Cinema of Indonesia and PT HelloMotion Korpora Indonesia. This school founded by Rev. Aditya on 8 April 2004 with the vision of "Realizing the imagination of every individual to become a reality", and short-term mission of "Being the best Creativity & Animation centers in Southeast Asia that provide positive benefits to the community". In addition to having animation school, Wadit also runs a production house named Dapupu Productions.

Its action in the world of animation has become one of 30 Most Inspiring People under 30 on the 2008 version of Hard Rock FM. In addition, her hard work has led to several awards. Here are some appreciations that has been achieved by Wahyu Aditya.

Animation Scholarship  & Cinema Industry by AOTS - Japan (2006)
Special Achievement Award - FAN / National Animation Festival (2007)
Finalist British Council - International Young Creative Entrepreneur of the Year - Design Category - Indonesia (2007)
Winner of the British Council - International Young Creative Entrepreneur of the Year - Film Category - Indonesia (2007)
World Winner of British Council - International Young Creative Entrepreneur of the Year - Film Category (2007)
Australian Alumni Award - Finalist Creativity & Design Award (in 2008)

References

Living people
1972 births